The Yongchun dialect (simplified Chinese: 永春话; traditional Chinese: 永春話; Pe̍h-ōe-jī: Éng-chhun-ōe) is a dialect of the Hokkien language mostly spoken in Yongchun County of Quanzhou city in Southern Fujian Province, China. It belongs to the Quanzhou Hokkien branch. 

Because most of the early immigrants to southern Malaysia were Quanzhou people, minority Quanzhou Yongchun people in Klang spoke the Yongchun dialect, and the other are assimilation by Tung'an Dialect.

Phonology
The table below contains all the finals of the Yongchun dialect.

References 

Hokkien-language dialects
Quanzhou